ASA Tel Aviv, is a handball club in Tel Aviv, Israel that competes in the Liga Leumit
The club was established in 1982. The team won the league championship in 2002 and five state cups (2002, 2005, 2008, 2009, 2010). The club is part of the greater ASA Tel Aviv sports club, which also has tennis, water polo, and women's handball teams.

The team colors are Blue and white, and it hosts home games at Sports Center, Tel Aviv University.

Titles 
Israel Champions (1): 2002
Israel Cup Holder (5): 2002, 2005, 2008, 2009, 2010

Notable players 
  Michael (Misha) Levin
  Dan Mirkos (Captain)
  Ido Lavie
  Tom Matalon
  Gil Pomerantz
  Gil Yaacov
  Andrei Ternovoi
  Viorel Mazilu
  Miro Barisic

See also
Sports in Israel

References

External links
 Team website (He/En)

Israeli handball clubs
Handball clubs established in 1982
Sport in Tel Aviv
1982 establishments in Israel